Uyun al-Hammam is a prehistoric burial site in Jordan. It is the earliest known formal burial site in the Middle East, and is possibly the oldest in the world. Remains at the 16,500-year-old burial site, located in Wadi Ziqlab, were first discovered in 2000.

The Natufian culture occupied the Levant, and had interred a red fox together with a human in this site dated 17,700–14,750 YBP. The remains were buried in such a manner as to suggest that prehistoric humans in that locale may have kept foxes as companion animals, in a similar way to dogs. The find provides information on the earliest burial practices of ancient humans.

References

Archaeological sites in Jordan
Natufian sites
Prehistoric burials